Vedvik or Vedvika is a village in Kinn Municipality in Vestland county, Norway. The population (2001) of Vedvik is 156.

Historically, Vedvik was an agricultural village focusing on milk production and sheep, but today most residents commute to Raudeberg or Måløy to work.  There is still some farming, but now it is mostly cattle.

References

Villages in Vestland
Kinn